Oz the Great and Powerful is a 2013 American fantasy adventure film directed by Sam Raimi and written by David Lindsay-Abaire and Mitchell Kapner from a story by Kapner. Based on L. Frank Baum's early 20th century Oz novels and set 20 years before the events of the original 1900 novel, the film is a spiritual prequel to the 1939 Metro-Goldwyn-Mayer film The Wizard of Oz. Starring James Franco in the title role, Mila Kunis, Rachel Weisz, Michelle Williams, Zach Braff, Bill Cobbs, Joey King, William Bock, and Tony Cox, the film tells the story of Oscar Diggs, a deceptive magician who arrives in the Land of Oz and encounters three witches: Theodora, Evanora, and Glinda. Oscar is then enlisted to restore order in Oz while struggling to resolve conflicts with the witches and himself.

Kapner began developing an origin story for the Wizard of Oz after a lifelong interest in wanting to create one for the character. Walt Disney Pictures commissioned the film's production in 2009 with Joe Roth as producer and Grant Curtis, Joshua Donen, Philip Steuer and Palak Patel serving as executive producers. Raimi was hired to direct the following year. After Robert Downey Jr. and Johnny Depp declined the titular role, Franco was cast in February 2011 with principal photography commencing five months later. Danny Elfman composed the film's score.

Oz the Great and Powerful premiered at the El Capitan Theatre on February 14, 2013, followed by a general theatrical release on March 8, 2013, in Disney Digital 3D, RealD 3D and IMAX 3D formats. Despite receiving mixed reviews from critics, the film grossed over $493 million worldwide against a $215 million budget, making it the 13th-highest-grossing film of 2013. The film won the Phoenix Film Critics Society Award for Best Live Action Family Film and Kunis won the MTV Movie Award for Best Villain for her performance as the Wicked Witch of the West.

Plot

In 1905 Kansas, Oscar Diggs is a magician and con artist in a traveling circus. The circus strongman learns Oscar has flirted with his wife and threatens him. Oscar escapes in a hot air balloon but is sucked into a tornado that takes him to the Land of Oz. There he encounters the naïve witch Theodora, who believes him to be the wizard prophesied to become King of Oz by defeating the Wicked Witch, who killed the previous king. The idea of being a wealthy monarch makes Oscar accept the role. En route to the Emerald City, Theodora falls in love with Oscar though he does not reciprocate her feelings. They encounter the flying monkey, Finley, who pledges a life debt to Oscar when he saves him from a lion. Oscar reveals his deception to Finley and forces him to maintain the idea that he is the wizard.

At the Emerald City, Theodora's older sister Evanora tells Oscar that the Wicked Witch resides in the Dark Forest and can be killed by destroying her wand. On the way to the forest, Oscar and Finley are joined by an orphaned living china doll whose village and family were destroyed by the Wicked Witch. The three reach the forest and discover the "Wicked Witch" is the late king's daughter Glinda the Good Witch, and Evanora is the true Wicked Witch. Evanora sees this with her crystal ball and tricks Theodora into thinking Oscar is trying to court all three witches at once. She offers Theodora a magic apple "to remove her heartache", but it turns her into a hideous green-skinned creature.

Glinda brings Oscar's group to her domain to escape Evanora's army of Winkies and flying baboons. She confides in Oscar that she knows he is not the wizard, but still believes he can help stop Evanora. He reluctantly takes charge of an "army" of Quadlings, Tinkers and Munchkins. Theodora enters Glinda's domain and angrily reveals her new hideous appearance to Oscar before threatening to kill him and his allies with the Emerald City's well-prepared army. Oscar despairs at his chances of victory, but after telling China Girl about the exploits of his hero Thomas Edison, he conceives a plan that relies on trickery.

Glinda and her subjects mount a fake attack on the Emerald City using a pulley-rig army of scarecrow puppets hidden by thick fog. The witches are tricked into sending their flying baboons through a poppy field that puts them to sleep, but Glinda is captured in the process. Meanwhile, Oscar infiltrates the Emerald City with his allies but apparently abandons them in a hot air balloon loaded with gold, which Theodora destroys with a fireball. As Evanora and Theodora prepare to kill Glinda, Oscar appears, having faked his betrayal and death. Using a hidden smoke machine and image projector, he presents a giant image of his face as his "true" form and a fireworks display to intimidate the Wicked Witches. Evanora fearfully hides in her castle while Theodora flees on her broom, unable to hurt the "invincible" wizard. Oscar offers to Theodora that she would be welcome to return if she overcomes her wickedness, but Theodora refuses and flies away to the West laughing maniacally, leaving Oscar saddened. China Girl frees Glinda from her restraints with her wand, and she engages Evanora in a magical duel in the throne room. Glinda destroys Evanora's emerald necklace, revealing her true hag-like appearance, and banishes her from the Emerald City, while Evanora is carried away by a pair of flying baboons.

Oscar, now ruler of Oz, uses his projector to sustain the belief that he is a powerful wizard. He presents gifts to his friends: Master Tinker, who helped build his machines, receives Oscar's jackknife while Knuck, the grumpy Munchkin herald who was called "Sourpuss" by Oscar as a running gag throughout the movie, receives a mask with a smiley face; the long-suffering Finley receives Oscar's friendship along with his top hat and China Girl accepts her friends as her new family. Finally, Oscar takes Glinda behind the curtains of his projector, thanks her for making him a better person, and they kiss.

Cast

 James Franco as Oscar Zoroaster Phadrig Isaac Norman Henkle Emmannuel Ambroise Diggs, commonly known as Oz, a philandering con artist, a stage magician and a barnstormer who is part of a traveling circus in the Midwest. He is whisked in a hot air balloon by a tornado to the Land of Oz, where he is believed to be a wizard destined to bring peace to the land, forcing him to overcome his dubious ethics to convince his peers he is the hero needed by the people of Oz. He eventually becomes what is known as the Wizard of Oz.
 Mila Kunis as Theodora, a naïve good witch who has the Land of Oz's best interests at heart. She believes that Oscar is the wizard prophesied to defeat the seemingly evil Glinda from the Dark Forest, developing an attraction to him in the process. Evanora gradually manipulates Theodora into thinking Oscar has betrayed her for Glinda, ushering her transformation into the Wicked Witch of the West.
 Rachel Weisz as Evanora, the protector of the Emerald City. Being the Wicked Witch of the East, she has a hideous form which she hides by wearing a necklace that gives her the appearance of a young woman. She deceives Oscar by framing Glinda for the King's murder and telling Oscar that Glinda is the Wicked Witch rather than herself.
 Michelle Williams as Glinda, the daughter of the late king and the Good Witch. She rules and protects a peaceful kingdom in Oz inhabited by kind Quadlings, tinkers, and Munchkins. Oscar originally believed her to be the Wicked Witch responsible for terrorizing the land. She guides Oscar to achieve his destiny of defeating Evanora, becoming his love interest in the process.
 Williams also plays Annie, an old flame of Oscar's and the future mother of Dorothy Gale.
 Zach Braff as the voice of Finley, a winged monkey who pledges an irrevocable life debt to Oscar, believing him to be the prophesied wizard, for saving him from the Cowardly Lion. He quickly regrets his decision when Oscar reveals he is not a wizard, but nonetheless becomes his loyal ally.
 Braff also plays Frank, Oscar's long-suffering yet loyal assistant in Kansas.
 Bill Cobbs as Master Tinker, the leader of the tinkers who are ruled by Glinda. He would later build the Tin Woodman.
 Joey King as the voice of China Girl, a young, living china doll from China Town where everything, including its inhabitants, is made of china. Her home is destroyed by Evanora, leaving her its only survivor when she is found by Oscar, with whom she forms a strong friendship after he uses glue to fix her legs.
 King also plays a young disabled girl volunteering in Oscar's magic show in Kansas.
 Tony Cox as Knuck/Sourpuss, the quick-tempered herald and fanfare player of Emerald City who is allied with Glinda.
Stephen R. Hart, Bruce Campbell and William Bock play Winkie guards at the Emerald City. Abigail Spencer plays May, Oscar's temporary magic assistant in Kansas and one of his several fleeting loves in the film. Tim Holmes plays the strongman who attacks Oscar for trying to court his wife (played by Toni Wynne), prompting Oscar to take the hot air balloon that sends him to the Land of Oz.

Raimi, who often casts friends and actor-regulars in cameo roles, cast his brother Ted as a small-town skeptic at Oscar's magic show who yells "I see a wire!", two of his former teachers—Jim Moll and Jim Bird—as well as Dan Hicks, Mia Serafino and his daughter Emma as Emerald City townspeople and the three actresses from his 1981 directorial debut The Evil Dead —Ellen Sandweiss, Betsy Baker and Theresa Tilly— as well as his sons Dashiell and Oliver respectively as Quadling townspeople. Gene Jones portrays a Wild West Barker, Martin Klebba portrays a Munchkin rebel, John Paxton who previously worked with Raimi in the Spider-Man trilogy and Drag Me to Hell makes a posthumous appearance as an Elder Tinker in his final film role before his death in November 2011 while the great grandson of Bert Lahr also portrays a tinker.

Continuity
Oz the Great and Powerful features several artistic allusions, homages, and technical parallels to Baum's novels and the 1939 Metro-Goldwyn-Mayer film, The Wizard of Oz.

The film's opening sequence is presented in black and white. When Oscar is caught up in the tornado, the audio switches from monaural to stereo and eventually surround sound. The film shifts to full color when Oscar arrives in Oz; additionally, the aspect ratio gradually widens from 4:3 Academy ratio to 2.35:1 widescreen. As in the 1939 film, Glinda travels in giant bubbles, and the Emerald City is actually emerald; in the novel, characters wear tinted glasses to make it appear so, though during the battle preparations sequence Oz can be seen wearing emerald goggles. The iconic green look of the Wicked Witch of the West is closer to her look in the 1939 film, as the Witch is a short, one-eyed crone in the novel. The Wicked Witches are portrayed as sisters, an idea which originated in the 1939 film. Also from the 1939 film is that several actors who play Oz characters make cameos in the Kansas segments, such as Frank, Oscar's assistant whom he refers to as his "trained monkey" (Frank's "Oz" counterpart is the winged monkey Finley) and a young disabled girl who serves as the Kansas counterpart to China Girl (in Kansas, Oscar is unable to make the wheelchair-using young girl walk, and gets a chance to do so when he repairs China Girl's broken legs); Annie who inspires Oscar to be a good and great person (Annie's "Oz" counterpart, Glinda, also inspires Oscar to be a better person) informs him that she has been proposed to by John Gale, presumably hinting at Dorothy Gale's parental lineage. Annie is seen wearing a gingham dress, a pattern famously associated with Dorothy. Interestingly, the names of Dorothy's parents are not mentioned in Baum's book, but John and Ann Smith are Ellie's parents from the book "The Wizard of the Emerald City" by Alexander Volkov.

Other referenced characters include the Scarecrow, who is built by the townspeople as a scare tactic; the Tin Woodman, whose creator is the Master Tinker that can build "anything"; and the lion that attacks Finley, a reference to the Cowardly Lion. Similarly, various other races of Oz are depicted besides the Munchkins; the Quadlings, the china doll inhabitants of Dainty China Country, and the Winkies (who went unnamed in the 1939 film). Similarly, Glinda is referred to by her title in the novel (the Good Witch of the South), unlike the 1939 film, where her character's title is "Good Witch of the North" (due to her character being merged with the Good Witch of the North). Glinda is also the daughter of the late King of Oz, though in the novels, Ozma is the King's daughter. Theodora's tears leave streak-like scars on her face, reflecting her weakness to water in the original story. Also, Oz is presented as a real place as it is in the novel, and not as a possible dream as the 1939 film implies.

Production

Disney's history with Oz
After the success of Snow White and the Seven Dwarfs in 1937, Walt Disney planned to produce an animated film based on the first of L. Frank Baum's Oz books. However, Roy O. Disney, the chairman of Walt Disney Productions, was informed by Baum's estate that they had sold the film rights to the first book to Samuel Goldwyn, who re-sold it to Louis B. Mayer in 1938. Ironically, the film was approved due to the success of Snow White. The project was then developed by Metro-Goldwyn-Mayer into the well-known musical adaptation which was released the following year.

In 1954, when the film rights to Baum's remaining thirteen Oz books were made available, Walt Disney Productions acquired them for use in Walt Disney's television series Disneyland which led to the live-action film Rainbow Road to Oz, which was abandoned and never completed. Disney's history with the Oz series continued with the 1985 film Return to Oz, which performed poorly, both critically and commercially, but has developed a cult following since its release by fans of the books who considered it a more faithful adaptation to the Oz books than the 1939 classic. After Return to Oz, Disney lost the film rights to the Oz books and they subsequently reverted to the public domain. In 2005, Disney produced the television film The Muppets' Wizard of Oz which aired on its network ABC.

Development
Upon the release of Wicked, screenwriter Mitchell Kapner felt he had missed his opportunity to explore the origins of the Wizard of Oz character. In 2009, he met with producer Joe Roth who turned down his current pitches and asked if he had any other ideas. Kapner, who had been reading the Oz series to his children, outlined the plots of the books. Roth stopped him on the sixth book, The Emerald City of Oz, which had some of the Wizard's backstory. Roth said:  Kapner and co-writer Palak Patel were turned down by Sony Pictures before the project was set up at Walt Disney Pictures in 2009. Disney president Sean Bailey commissioned Oz the Great and Powerful (under the working title "Brick") during the tenure of chairman Dick Cook, who was succeeded by Rich Ross, and later Alan Horn, a succession in management rarely survived by a major studio release. David Lindsay-Abaire was later hired to do a re-write.

Roth initially sought Robert Downey Jr. for the title role of the Wizard. Sam Raimi was hired to direct in 2010 from a shortlist including Sam Mendes and Adam Shankman. In January 2011, Downey declined the role and it was offered to Johnny Depp, who had previously collaborated with the studio in Pirates of the Caribbean and Alice in Wonderland. Depp liked the role but was already committed to The Lone Ranger. In February, James Franco accepted $7 million to star in the film, five months before filming was scheduled to begin. Franco and Raimi had previously worked together on the Spider-Man trilogy, in which Franco played Peter Parker's best friend Harry Osborn. Franco received training for the role from magician Lance Burton.

Kapner adapted the character of the Wizard from the novels to conceptualize an original story, and Raimi ensured that the film would "nod lovingly" to the 1939 film by inserting references and homages to it.

Disney wanted to reduce the film's production budget to $200 million. Casting calls were put out for local actors in Michigan.

Filming
Principal photography for Oz the Great and Powerful began July 25, 2011, at Raleigh Michigan Studios in Pontiac, Michigan, employing 3D cameras.

Raimi opted to use practical sets in conjunction with computer-generated imagery during filming. Physical sets were constructed so the actors could have a visual reference, as opposed to using green screen technology for every scene. Chroma key compositing was only used for background pieces. Zach Braff and Chloë Grace Moretz were on set, recording their dialogue simultaneously with the other actors, whenever their CG characters were present in a scene. Puppetry was employed for a physical version of the China Girl to serve as a visual key-point for actors to manipulate. Braff wore a blue motion capture suit to create Finley's movements and had a camera close to his face for the flying sequences to obtain facial movements.

Art director Robert Stromberg, who worked on Avatar and Alice in Wonderland, drew inspiration from the films of Frank Capra and James Wong Howe to achieve the Art Deco design he envisioned for the Emerald City. Stromberg contrasted the colorful tonal qualities of Oz with the restrained appearance of Alice, affirming that although both films explore similar fantasy worlds, the overall atmosphere and landscape of each "are completely different." In 2011, Stromberg and his team visited the Walt Disney archives during the pre-production phase to reference production art from Disney's animated films such as Pinocchio, Bambi, Fantasia, Cinderella, Sleeping Beauty, Alice in Wonderland and Snow White and the Seven Dwarfs, drawing from designs and textures in order to give certain settings in the film an affectionate nod to the Disney style. Costume designer Gary Jones focused on authenticity with his wardrobe designs: "We started by doing a lot of research and having ideas of the ways (costumes) should look in order to be (historically accurate) but as we went on, we really began creating a whole new world."

Although the film is a spiritual prequel to the 1939 Metro-Goldwyn-Mayer film The Wizard of Oz, it was not allowed legally to be considered as such. The filmmakers had to toe a fine line between calling the film to mind but not infringing upon it. To that end, Disney had a copyright expert on set to ensure no infringement occurred. The production team worked under the constraint of abiding by the stipulations set forth by Warner Bros., the legal owner of the rights to iconic elements of the 1939 film (via its Turner Entertainment sister company which purchased the MGM film library in 1986), including the ruby slippers worn by Judy Garland. Therefore, Disney was unable to use them nor any original character likenesses from the 1939 film. This extended to the green of the Wicked Witch's skin for which Disney used what its legal department considered a sufficiently different shade dubbed "Theostein" (a portmanteau of "Theodora" and "Frankenstein"). Additionally, the studio could not use the signature chin mole of Margaret Hamilton's portrayal of the Wicked Witch of the West nor could they employ the yellow brick road's swirl design for Munchkinland. The expert also ensured that the Emerald City was not too close in appearance to the original Emerald City in the 1939 film.

While Warner and Disney did not engage in copyright battle, they did file rival trademarks. In October 2012, Disney filed a trademark on "Oz the Great and Powerful" while one week later Warner filed its own trademarks for "The Great and Powerful Oz". The U.S. Patent and Trademark Office suspended Warner's attempt at a trademark because Disney had filed basically the same one a week earlier.

In addition to the legal issues, the film was also faced with delays when several cast members went on hiatus due to unrelated commitments and circumstances. Rachel Weisz left halfway through the shoot to film her entire role in The Bourne Legacy, Michelle Williams was required to promote the release of My Week with Marilyn and Franco's father died during production. Roth compared the task of managing overlapping schedules to "being an air-traffic controller." Mila Kunis's makeup and prosthetics were supervised by Greg Nicotero and demanded four hours to apply and another hour to remove, with Kunis taking nearly two months to fully recover from the subsequent removal of the makeup from her skin. Raimi had to edit the frightening nature of several scenes to secure Disney's desired PG-rating from the MPAA. Sony Pictures Imageworks was contracted to create the film's visual effects.

Music

In June 2011, composer Danny Elfman was chosen to score the film despite Elfman and Raimi having fallen-out over Spider-Man 2 and Elfman having declared they would never again work together. He noted that the film's score was accessibly quick to produce, with a majority of the music being written in six weeks. Regarding the tonal quality of the score, Elfman stated, "We're going to take an approach that's old school but not self-consciously old-fashioned. Let the melodrama be melodrama, let everything be what it is. I also think there's the advantage that I'm able to write narratively, and when I'm able to write narratively I can also move quicker because that's my natural instincts, I can tell a story in the music."

American singer-songwriter Mariah Carey recorded a promotional single called "Almost Home" written by Carey, Simone Porter, Justin Gray, Lindsey Ray, Tor Erik Hermansen, and Mikkel Eriksen (a.k.a. Stargate) for the soundtrack of the film. The single was released on February 19, 2013 by Island Records. The original soundtrack to Oz the Great and Powerful was released digitally and physically by Walt Disney Records on March 5, 2013. The physical CD release was released in association with Intrada Records on March 26.

Release

Theatrical
In May 2011 before filming began, Walt Disney Studios Motion Pictures gave Oz the Great and Powerful a March 8, 2013 North American theatrical release date. The film had its world premiere at the El Capitan Theatre in Hollywood on February 14, 2013. Disney opened the film in wide release in 3,912 theaters.

To promote the film, Disney partnered with the IMAX Corporation and HSN to coordinate a hot air balloon campaign across the United States beginning in California at the Walt Disney Studios lot in Burbank, stopping at four locations; the El Capitan Theatre during the world premiere, the Disneyland Resort in Anaheim, the Daytona International Speedway in Florida and Central Park in New York City. Disney also promoted the film through its theme parks; Epcot's International Flower and Garden Festival featured a multi-purpose garden and play area themed to the film and Disney California Adventure hosted sample viewings inside the Muppet*Vision 3D theatre. The estimated marketing campaign cost upwards of $100 million.

Home media
Oz the Great and Powerful was released by Walt Disney Studios Home Entertainment on Blu-ray, Blu-ray 3D, DVD, and digital download on June 11, 2013. The film is Disney's first home media release to exclude a physical digital copy disc and instead provides only a digital code for the download. Oz the Great and Powerful debuted at number one in its first week of home media release in overall disc sales with 46% of its first week sales from Blu-ray Discs. The film has earned $52 million in sales.

Reception

Box office
Oz the Great and Powerful earned $234.9 million in the United States and Canada, and $258.4 million in other countries for a worldwide total of $493.3 million. Worldwide, it was the thirteenth-highest-grossing film of 2013. Deadline Hollywood calculated the net profit of the film to be $36 million, when factoring together all expenses and revenues, making it the 13th most profitable release of 2013. It topped the box office on its worldwide opening weekend with $149 million. Before its theatrical release, several media outlets reported that Oz the Great and Powerful was expected to duplicate the box office performance of 2010's Alice in Wonderland. However, Oz accumulated less than half of Alices worldwide gross.

Preliminary reports had the film tracking for an $80–100 million debut in North America. The movie earned $2 million from 9 p.m. showings on Thursday night. For its opening day, Oz the Great and Powerful grossed $24.1 million, the fourth-highest March opening day. During its opening weekend, the film topped the box office with $79.1 million, the third-highest March opening weekend. Despite the film's solid debut, which was larger than nearly all comparable titles, it clearly lagged behind Alice in Wonderland's opening ($116.1 million). The film's 3-D share of the opening weekend was 53%. Females made up 52% of the audience. Surprisingly, though, families only represented 41% of attendance, while couples accounted for 43%. The film retained first place at the box office during its second weekend with $41.3 million.

Outside North America, the film earned $69.9 million on its opening weekend from 46 territories. Among all markets, its highest-grossing debuts were achieved in Russia and the CIS ($14.7 million), China ($9.06 million), France and the Maghreb region ($5.77 million). The film's openings trailed Alice in Wonderland in all major markets except Russia and the CIS. It retained first place at the box office outside North America for a second weekend. In total grosses, Ozs largest countries are Russia and the CIS ($27.4 million), China ($25.9 million) and the UK, Ireland and Malta ($23.4 million).

Critical response
On review aggregator Rotten Tomatoes, Oz the Great and Powerful received an approval rating of 57% based on 273 reviews, with an average rating of 6.00/10. The site's critical consensus reads, "It suffers from some tonal inconsistency and a deflated sense of wonder, but Oz the Great and Powerful still packs enough visual dazzle and clever wit to be entertaining in its own right." On Metacritic the film holds a score of 44 out of 100, based on 42 critics, indicating "mixed to average reviews". Audiences polled by CinemaScore gave the film an average grade of "B+" on an A+ to F scale.

Kim Newman, writing for Empire, gave the film 4 out of 5 stars and said, "If there are post-Harry Potter children who don't know or care about The Wizard Of Oz, they might be at sea with this story about a not-very-nice grownup in a magic land, but long-term Oz watchers will be enchanted and enthralled ... Mila Kunis gets a gold star for excellence in bewitchery and Sam Raimi can settle securely behind the curtain as a mature master of illusion." Critic Alonso Duralde also admired the movie: "That Oz the Great and Powerful is so thoroughly effective both on its own terms and as a prequel to one of the most beloved movies ever made indicates that this team has magic to match any witch or wizard." Leonard Maltin on IndieWire claimed that "No movie ever can, or will, replace 1939's The Wizard Of Oz, but taken on its own terms, this eye-filling fantasy is an entertaining riff on how the Wizard of that immortal film found his way to Oz." IGN rated the film 7.8 and said, "The film is expansive and larger-than-life in scope and so are the performances, overall. Franco in particular hams it up and is often playing to the balcony ... The 3D is utilized just as it should be in a children's fantasy epic such as this – overtly, but with skill. Snowflakes, music boxes and mysterious animals all leap through the screen towards the audience as the story unfolds."

Justin Chang of Variety had a mixed reaction, writing that the film "gets some mileage out of its game performances, luscious production design and the unfettered enthusiasm director Sam Raimi brings to a thin, simplistic origin story." He also compared the film's scale with the Star Wars prequel trilogy adding, "In a real sense, Oz the Great and Powerful has a certain kinship with George Lucas's Star Wars prequels, in the way it presents a beautiful but borderline-sterile digital update of a world that was richer, purer and a lot more fun in lower-tech form. Here, too, the actors often look artificially superimposed against their CG backdrops, though the intensity of the fakery generates its own visual fascination." /Film rated the film 7 out of 10, saying it had "many charms" while considering it to be "basically Army of Darkness: (Normal guy lands in magical land, is forced to go on quest to save that land.) But just when you see Raimi's kinetic, signature style starting to unleash, the story forces the film back into its Disney shell to play to the masses. We're left with a film that's entertaining, a little scarier than you'd expect, but extremely inconsistent."

Richard Roeper, writing for Roger Ebert, noted the film's omnipresent visual effects but was largely disappointed by the performance of some cast members; "... to see Williams so bland and sugary as Glinda, and Kunis so flat and ineffectual as the heartsick Theodora ..." Marshall Fine of The Huffington Post was unimpressed, writing, "Oh, it's exciting enough for a six-year-old; anyone older, however, will already have been exposed to so much on TV, at the movies and on the Internet that this will seem like so much visual cotton-candy. Even a sophisticated grade-schooler will find these doings weak and overblown." Similarly, Todd McCarthy criticized the characterization, writing that the film's supporting cast "can't begin to compare with their equivalents in the original ... so the burden rests entirely upon Franco and Williams, whose dialogue exchanges are repetitive and feel tentative." Entertainment Weekly agreed, giving the film a C+ and saying that the "miscast" Franco "lacks the humor, charm, and gee-whiz wonder we're meant to feel as he trades wisecracks with a flying monkey ... and soars above a field of poppies in a giant soap bubble. If he's not enchanted, how are we supposed to be?" and complaining that "while Raimi's Oz is like retinal crack, he never seduces our hearts and minds." Alisha Coelho of in.com gave the movie 2.5 stars, saying "Oz The Great and Powerful doesn't leave a lasting impression, but is an a-ok watch."

Accolades

Possible sequel
On March 7, 2013, Variety confirmed that Disney has already approved plans for a sequel, with Mitchell Kapner returning as screenwriter. Mila Kunis said during an interview with E! News, "We're all signed on for sequels". On March 8, 2013, Sam Raimi told Bleeding Cool that he has no plans to direct the sequel, saying, "I did leave some loose ends for another director if they want to make the picture", and that "I was attracted to this story, but I don't think the second one would have the thing I would need to get me interested". On March 11, 2013, Joe Roth said to the Los Angeles Times that the sequel would "absolutely not" involve Dorothy, with Kapner pointing out that there are twenty years between the events of the first film and Dorothy's arrival, and "a lot can happen in that time". As of 2023, Disney has not begun development on a sequel.

See also
 Adaptations of The Wizard of Oz

References

External links

 
 
 
 
 

2013 films
2013 3D films
2010s fantasy adventure films
American 3D films
American black-and-white films
American children's fantasy films
American fantasy adventure films
Circus films
Films scored by Danny Elfman
Films about magic and magicians
Films about orphans
Films based on American novels
Films based on fantasy novels
Films directed by Sam Raimi
Films produced by Joe Roth
Films set in 1905
Films set in Kansas
Films shot in Michigan
Films with screenplays by David Lindsay-Abaire
High fantasy films
IMAX films
Films partially in color
Films based on The Wizard of Oz
Films using motion capture
Films about witchcraft
Walt Disney Pictures films
Prequel films
2010s English-language films
2010s American films
American prequel films